Leroy F. Moore Jr. is an African American writer, poet, community activist, and feminist. Moore was born November 2, 1967, in New York City. Moore is one of the founders of Krip Hop.

Moore and his counterparts Rob DA’ Noise Temple, and Keith Jones started Krip Hop, a movement that uses hip-hop music as a means of expression for people with disabilities.  The primary goal of the Krip Hop Nation is to increase awareness in music and media outlets of the talents, history and rights of people with disabilities. The Krip Hop Nation also focuses on advocacy, activism and education and holds workshops on relevant social, artistic, and political issues.

In addition to his work with Krip Hop, since the 1990s, Moore has written the column "Ill in-N-Chilling" for POOR Magazine. Moore is also a co-founder of the disability performance art collective Sins Invalid. Additionally, he currently serves as the Chair of the Black Disability Studies Committee for the National Black Disability Coalition. He co-authored a children's book called Black Disabled Art History 101.

References

1967 births
Living people
21st-century American poets
African-American activists
African-American poets
American people with disabilities
American disability rights activists
21st-century African-American writers
20th-century African-American people